Marc Englehart is an American professional vert skater. Englehart has earned many podium spots in his career, a gold medal in the 2002 Gravity Games, a silver medal in 2003 ASA Pro Tour, a silver medal in 2004 ASA Pro Tour, a silver medal in 2007 Action Sports World Tour and more.

Best Tricks Frontside 1080, Double Flatspin 540 and Flatspin 540 Snakebike

Vert competitions 
2008 LG Action Sports World Championships, Seattle, WA - Vert: 7th
2007 LG Action Sports World Championships, Dallas, TX - Vert: 4th
2007 Action Sports World Tour, San Diego, CA - Vert: 2nd
2007 Vodafone X-Air, Wellington, New Zealand - Vert: 1st
2006 LG Action Sports World Championships, Dallas, TX - Vert: 2nd
2006 Action Sports US Vert Championship, San Diego, CA - Vert: 2nd
2006 LG Action Sports World Tour, Paris, France - Vert: 5th
2006 LG Action Sports World Tour, Berlin, Germany - Vert: 2nd
2006 LG Action Sports World Tour, Birmingham, England - Vert: 9th
2006 LG Action Sports World Tour, Amsterdam, Netherlands - Vert: 3rd
2006 Action Sports World Tour, Richmond, VA - Vert: 3rd
2005 LG Action Sports World Championship, Manchester, England - Vert: 13th
2005 Mobile Skatepark Series, Cincinnati, OH: 3rd
2005 LG Action Sports Tour, Moscow, Russia: 7th
2005 LG Action Sports Tour, Germany: 3rd
2005 LG Action Sports Tour, Paris, France: 4th
2005 LG Action Sports Tour, Sacramento, CA: 3rd
2004 ASA Pro Tour Year-End Ranking (Vert): 4th
2004 LG Action Sports Championships - Vert: 4th
2004 ASA Pro Tour, Niagara Falls, NY - Vert: 2nd
2004 ASA Pro Tour, Cincinnati, OH - Vert: 4th
2003 Gravity Games: 3rd
2003 ASA Pro Tour, Dulles, VA: 3rd
2003 ASA Pro Tour, Buffalo, NY: 2nd
2002 ASA World Championships: 3rd
2002 ASA Pro Tour, Baltimore, MD: 4th
2002 ESPN X Games: 3rd
2002 Gravity Games: 1st
2002 MSS - Vert Sick Trick Rank: 3rd
2002 ASA Pro Tour, Cincinnati, OH: 5th
2002 ASA Pro Tour, Gwinnett County, GA: 5th

References

External links

espneventmedia.com
skatelog.com
asaentertainment.com
espneventmedia.com
espneventmedia.com
rollingupdates.com
whatiexpect.in
cincinnati.com

1983 births
Living people
Vert skaters
X Games athletes
People from Sellersville, Pennsylvania